The Anderson Hollow Archaeological District is a complex of historical sites in rural Rockbridge County, Virginia.  The area consists of at least seven known prehistoric and historic sites, including some American pioneer settlement sites from the early 19th century, and some that were occupied as late as 1960.  The sites include stone foundations, the chimney remains of log houses, and a full range of settlements across that time period.

The sites were listed on the National Register of Historic Places in 1983.

See also
National Register of Historic Places listings in Rockbridge County, Virginia

References

National Register of Historic Places in Rockbridge County, Virginia
Archaeological sites on the National Register of Historic Places in Virginia
Buildings and structures completed in 1827
Historic districts on the National Register of Historic Places in Virginia
1827 establishments in Virginia